Bouquet of Small Chrysanthemums is a mid 19th century still life watercolor by Léon Bonvin. The drawing, which depicts a vase of flowers set on a table, is currently in the collection of the Metropolitan Museum of Art.

Poor and largely self-taught, Bonvin, born in Vaugirard near Paris, went largely unrecognized by the art world and hung himself in 1866 at the age of 32.

References 

Paintings in the collection of the Metropolitan Museum of Art
1862 paintings